Willowfield School is a  mixed gender secondary school in Walthamstow, East London with 870 students on roll. It admits 180 students to Year 7 each year. The current headteacher is Clive Rosewell, who succeeded  John Hemingway in  April 2016. The school moved to a purpose-built site in 2015.

Awards
 A Holder of the ArtsMark Silver Award – for the quality of the opportunities offered in music, drama, art and dance.
 A Holder of the Healthy Schools Award – for the work done to encourage students to adopt healthy lifestyles.

References

External links
Official website

Secondary schools in the London Borough of Waltham Forest
Community schools in the London Borough of Waltham Forest
Walthamstow